Eric Joseph Trapp (17 July 1910 – 8 September 1993) was an Anglican bishop in the mid-20th century.

Early life
Born on 17 July 1910 and educated at Alderman Newton's School in Leicester, and then at Leeds University, he undertook a period of study at the College of the Resurrection, Mirfield, to prepare for ordination.

Ordained ministry
He was ordained in 1935. Following a curacy at St Olave's, Mitcham, he emigrated to South Africa where he was director of the Masite Mission, Basutoland, then rector of  St Augustine's Bethlehem, Orange Free State. Next he was rector of  St John's, Maseru, then a canon of Bloemfontein Cathedral.

He was appointed to the episcopate as the seventh bishop of Zululand in  1947, a post he held for ten years. He was then secretary of the SPG  until 1970 when he was appointed the fifth bishop of Bermuda, a post he held for five years.

In retirement he served as an assistant bishop within the Diocese of St Albans. He died on 8 September 1993.

References

1910 births
People educated at Alderman Newton's School, Leicester
Alumni of the University of Leeds
Alumni of the College of the Resurrection
Anglican bishops of Zululand
20th-century Anglican bishops in Bermuda
Anglican bishops of Bermuda
20th-century Anglican Church of Southern Africa bishops
1993 deaths